The AFC Asian Cup is the primary association football competition contested by the senior men's national teams of the members of the Asian Football Confederation (AFC), determining the continental champion of Asia. It is the second oldest continental football championship in the world after Copa América. The winning team becomes the champion of Asia and until 2015 qualified for the FIFA Confederations Cup.

The Asian Cup was held once every four years from the 1956 edition in Hong Kong until the 2004 tournament in China. However, since the Summer Olympic Games and the European Football Championship were also scheduled in the same year as the Asian Cup, the AFC decided to move their championship to a less crowded cycle.  After 2004, the tournament was next held in 2007, when it was co-hosted by four countries in Southeast Asia: Indonesia, Malaysia, Thailand and Vietnam. Thereafter, it has been held every four years.

The Asian Cup has generally been dominated by a small number of top  teams. Initially successful teams included South Korea (twice) and Iran (three times). Since 1984, Japan (four times) and Saudi Arabia (three times) have been the most successful teams, together winning seven of the last ten finals. The other teams which have achieved success are Qatar (2019 current champions), Australia (2015), Iraq (2007) and Kuwait (1980). Israel won in 1964 but was later expelled and has since joined UEFA.

Australia joined the Asian confederation in 2007 and hosted the Asian Cup finals in 2015, winning the competition in the final against South Korea. The 2019 tournament was expanded from 16 teams to 24 teams, with the qualifying process doubling as part of the qualification for the 2018 FIFA World Cup.

History

Beginning
A pan-Asian competition was first proposed after the end of World War II, but it was not implemented until the 1950s. Two years after the Asian Football Confederation (AFC) came into being in 1954, the first ever AFC Asian Cup was staged in Hong Kong with seven of the twelve founding members taking part, making the tournament the second oldest continental competition in the world. The qualifying process involved the hosts plus the winners of the various zones (Central, Eastern and Western). It was only a four-team tournament, a format that also existed for 1960 and 1964. Each sub-confederation already hosts their own biennial championship, each with varying degrees of interest.

South Korea demonstrated its superiority in the early years of the competition as the country conquered the 1956 and 1960; this remains as South Korea's best achievements in the tournament.

West Asian domination (1964–1988)
After Hong Kong and South Korea hosting the two first editions, Israel was chosen as hosts of the 1964 AFC Asian Cup. Using the same format of the two previous editions, this tournament only had four teams and played in one single group to determine the champions. Israel eventually topped the tournament ahead of India with three wins. The format was updated to five teams in 1968 before it was expanded to six teams in 1972 and 1976.

The tournament became the preserve of Iran who won three consecutive tournaments in 1968, 1972 and 1976, with Iran hosting the former and the latter. Iran stays as the only national team in Asia to have won three consecutive Asian Cups. The 1972 final was notable as it was the first Asian Cup to use the group stage-knockout phase format, which was followed in the subsequent tournaments with some alternation. However, the tournament was marked with a dark note when Israel was expelled from the AFC in 1972 due to Arab–Israeli conflict.

From 1980 to 1988, the number of teams taking part expanded to ten, but West Asian countries continued their domination in the 1980s with Kuwait becoming the first Arab country to win the championship in 1980 held at home soil, beating South Korea 3–0 in the final. Saudi Arabia, after an initial poor start, began to emerge as the country qualified, then won two consecutive Asian trophies in 1984 and 1988, overcame both China and South Korea. Both tournaments were Saudi Arabia's debuts in any major competitions.

Japan's rise and professionalization of Asian Cup (1992–2011)
Up until 1990s, the AFC Asian Cup was mostly played in a more amateur level, despite its attempt to raise the standard. However, with Asia being granted more spots for the FIFA World Cup, attempts to professionalize the tournament also began. By the end of 1990s, the tournament has begun to be professionalized.

Japan until 1990s was mostly a small name in Asian football, and the country only qualified for the 1988 edition, the first time Japan took part in a continental football tournament. However, as Japan started to make a concrete move inroad to professional football, the country's fortunes increased. Japan hosted the 1992 AFC Asian Cup, which was reduced to eight teams and two groups, where it emerged victorious after beating Saudi Arabia, then-defending champions, 1–0, to win the country's first major international honour.

The 1996 AFC Asian Cup saw the tournament expanded to twelve teams in its process of professionalization. Held by the United Arab Emirates, the hosts breached into the final for the first time ever but was unable to win the trophy after losing to Saudi Arabia, who made it into the country's fourth consecutive Asian finals, on penalties. It was Saudi Arabia's third Asian title.

The 2000 AFC Asian Cup saw Lebanon took part in its first Asian tournament, and it was Saudi Arabia who again reached the final, but this time, Japan triumphed over Saudi Arabia 1–0 in a final filled with a majority of Saudi supporters. Japan would go on to retain their Asian trophy four years later, albeit in a more struggling style and a very heated, politically charged final toward hosts China. The 2004 edition was notable as it expanded to 16 teams and Saudi Arabia's absent from an Asian Cup final for the first time.

The 2007 AFC Asian Cup gained notable for the debut of Australia, which had abandoned the Oceania Football Confederation in 2006 (coincidentally the first team to qualify for the tournament), as well as being the first football competition in the world to be hosted by more than two nations, with four countries in Southeast Asia (Vietnam, Thailand, Malaysia, Indonesia) hosting. In this tournament, Iraq crowned as Asian champions despite the ravaging American invasion, overpowering the likes of Australia, South Korea and Saudi Arabia in process.

Australia (which joined the AFC in 2006), after its poor debut in 2007, rebounded to reach the final in 2011 AFC Asian Cup in Qatar, but lost to Japan after extra-time; the win for Japan meant it became the most decorated team in Asian football with four titles. Still, the tournament was notable as the first Asian Cup to use the jersey numbers' order from 1 to 23, previously not practised in prior competitions.

Expansion of the Asian Cup (2015–now)
Following Australia's successes in the 2011 Asian Cup, the AFC approved the country to host the 2015 AFC Asian Cup. At the tournament, Australia managed to clamp down every opponent with only one loss, against eventual finalist South Korea, whom Australia would get a 2–1 final revenge after extra-time; the win officially sealed Southeast Asia's first Asian title as Australia joined the AFF in 2013.

At the 2019 AFC Asian Cup, the video assistant referees were used in the tournament for the first time, as well as an expansion to 24 teams. In addition, a fourth substitution was allowed during extra time. The tournament, hosted by the United Arab Emirates for the second time, witnessed the rise of Qatar, who conquered its first ever Asian title after beating Japan in the final 3–1. The tournament was marred by the Qatar diplomatic crisis, due to the UAE's entry ban on Qatari supporters, as well as shoe-throwing in the two's semi-final clash.

Format

Final tournament
Since 1972, the final tournament is played in two stages: the group stage and the knockout stage. Since 2019, each team plays three games in a group of four, with the winners and runners-up from each group advancing to the knockout stage along with the four best third-placed teams. In the knockout stage the sixteen teams compete in a single-elimination tournament, beginning with the round of 16 and ending with the final match of the tournament.

Trophy

There have been two Asian Cup trophies; the first one used between 1956 and 2015, and the second one in use since 2019.

The first trophy came in a form of a bowl with circular base. It was 42 centimeters tall and weighs 15 kilograms. Until the 2000 tournament, the black base contained plaques engraved with names of every winning country, as well as the edition won. The trophy was redesigned, adding more silver and reduce the black base to just a thin layer down. This base was plaque-free and the winning countries' names were engraved around the base.

During the draw for the 2019 group stage on 4 May 2018 at the Burj Khalifa in Dubai, an all new trophy made by Thomas Lyte was unveiled. It is 78 centimeters tall, 42 centimeters wide, and weighs 15 kilograms of silver. The trophy is modeled over lotus flower, a symbolically important aquatic Asian plant. Five petals of the lotus symbolize the five sub-confederations under the AFC. The winning countries' names are engraved around the trophy base, which is separable from the trophy's main body. This trophy has a handle on each side, unlike its predecessor.

Results

Summary

Notes:

Bold text denotes team was host country.

Timeline

Records and statistics

Awards

There are currently five post-tournament awards
 the Most Valuable Player for best player;
 the Top Goalscorer for most prolific goal scorer;
 the Best Goalkeeper  for most outstanding goalkeeper; 
 the Team of the Tournament for best combined team of players at the tournament;
 the Fair Play Award for the team with the best record of fair play.

Controversies
Despite being the second oldest continental football tournament, the AFC Asian Cup has suffered numerous criticisms. Criticisms over the inability of the AFC Asian Cup to attract large attendances, political interference, high costs of traveling between AFC member states and different cultures were highlighted over the Asian Cup.

Political interference
The AFC Asian Cup is marked with numerous instances of political interference. One of these was the case of Israel, as the team used to be a member of the AFC but following the Yom Kippur War and increasing tensions against the Arab AFC members, Israel was expelled from the AFC in 1974 and had to compete in OFC, until being granted UEFA membership in 1990. Meanwhile, similar cases also exist in other AFC tournaments like the one between Saudi Arabia and Iran. Following the 2016 attack on the Saudi diplomatic missions in Iran, Saudi Arabia had refused to play against Iran and even threatened to withdraw, afterwards blowing over onto international level. Tensions between the two Koreas during qualification for the 2010 FIFA World Cup had led North Korea to withdraw from hosting the South Korean team and refusing to display the South Korean flag and play their national anthem. As a result, North Korea's home matches were moved to Shanghai.

Low attendances
Low crowds have also been another problems for the AFC Asian Cup. At the 2011 AFC Asian Cup, there had been concerns over low record of crowds due to little football interests and high costs of traveling between Asian nations leading to then-Australia coach Holger Osieck claiming that the Qatar Armed Forces were used to fill up the stadiums simply for aesthetics, while Australia international Brett Holman commented, "Worldwide it's not recognised as a good tournament".

See also
 AFC Asian Cup qualifiers
 AFC U-23 Asian Cup
 AFC U-20 Asian Cup
 AFC U-17 Asian Cup
 AFF Championship
 CAFA Championship
 EAFF E-1 Football Championship
 SAFF Championship
 WAFF Championship

References

External links

AFC Asian Cup official history book
RSSSF archive

 
1
Asian championships
Recurring sporting events established in 1956
Association football events